The 2012 RS:X World Championships were held in Cadiz, Spain (Puerto Sherry) between March 20 and March 28.

The regattas of the medal race were canceled due to strong winds.

Men's results

Women's results

See also
Windsurfing World Championships

References

External links
Official website

2012
RS:X World Championships
Sailing competitions in Spain